The 2018 William Jones Cup was the 40th staging of William Jones Cup, an international basketball tournament held in New Taipei City, Taiwan.

The men's tournament was held from 14–22 July 2018 with 11 teams participating. The women's tournament was held from 25–29 July 2018 and was contested by six teams. Both tournaments were held at the Xinzhuang Gymnasium in New Taipei City and followed a single round robin format.

Men's tournament

Participating teams

Team standings

Games

Day 1

Day 2

Day 3

Day 4

Day 5

Day 6

Day 7

Day 8

Day 9

Women's tournament

Participating teams

Team standings

Games

Day 1

Day 2

Day 3

Day 4

Day 5

References 

2018
2018 in Taiwanese sport
2018–19 in Asian basketball
William Jones Cup